The following lists events that happened during 1886 in New Zealand.

Incumbents

Regal and viceregal
Head of State – Queen Victoria
Governor – Lieutenant-General Sir William Jervois.

Government and law
The 9th New Zealand Parliament continues.

Speaker of the House – Maurice O'Rorke.
Premier – Robert Stout
Minister of Finance – Julius Vogel
Chief Justice – Hon Sir James Prendergast

Main centre leaders
Mayor of Auckland – William Waddel followed by Albert Devore
Mayor of Christchurch – Charles Hulbert followed by Aaron Ayers
Mayor of Dunedin – John Barnes followed by Richard Henry Leary
Mayor of Wellington – Arthur Winton Brown

Events 
 11 April: Sinking of the steamer Taiaroa near the mouth of the Waiau Toa / Clarence River with the loss of 34 lives.
 10 June: Eruption of Mount Tarawera volcano results in the deaths of ~150 people and the (wrongly assumed) destruction of the famous Pink and White Terraces, an error corrected by 2017 research disclosing the locations of the Pink and White Terraces around today's lake.
 1 September: Police Force Act comes into effect, splitting the New Zealand Police Force from the standing army (and militia).

Sport

Cricket
The first recorded game of Women's cricket in New Zealand takes place in the Nelson district.

Major race winners
New Zealand Cup – Spade Guinea
New Zealand Derby – Disowned
Auckland Cup – Nelson (Australian owned)
Wellington Cup – Nelson (Australian owned)

Lawn bowls
The New Zealand Bowling Association is formed with twelve clubs. Only two clubs (from New Plymouth and Auckland) are from the North Island which will eventually lead to the events of 1891. A national championships is held but the winners are not recorded.

Rugby union
The Wairarapa and Manawatu unions are formed.

Provincial club rugby champions include: 
see also :Category:Rugby union in New Zealand

Shooting
Ballinger Belt – Sergeant Remington (Wanganui)

Tennis
A national tennis association is convened in Hastings . The first National Championships take place later in the 1886–87 season. (see 1887)

Births
 4 January: Vincent Ward, politician.
 8 June (in Devonshire): John Weeks, painter.
 5 August: Charles Boswell, politician.

Undated
Alice May Palmer, public servant and union official (d. 1977)

Deaths
 15 June: Robert Gillies, politician
 29 July: James Paterson, politician
 21 September: John Bathgate, politician
 27 December: William Crompton, politician.

See also
List of years in New Zealand
Timeline of New Zealand history
History of New Zealand
Military history of New Zealand
Timeline of the New Zealand environment
Timeline of New Zealand's links with Antarctica

References
General
Romanos, J. (2001) New Zealand Sporting Records and Lists. Auckland: Hodder Moa Beckett. 
Specific

External links